Robert "Robbie" VanderLaan (c. 1930-November 1, 2015) was a former majority leader of the Michigan State Senate. A Republican, he ran to replace Gerald Ford as representative for Michigan's 5th congressional district in a 1974 special election, but was defeated by Democrat Richard Vander Veen. It was seen as a stunning upset; VanderLaan had previously never lost an election and the district had long been considered a Republican stronghold. He served in the Senate for 20 years in total; after retirement he joined Democrat Bobby Crim in forming a lobbying firm; he also had a career as a lawyer.

References

1930s births
2015 deaths
American people of Dutch descent
Republican Party Michigan state senators
Michigan lawyers
Politicians from Grand Rapids, Michigan
People from Kentwood, Michigan
20th-century American lawyers
20th-century American politicians